Elisabeth Luther was the first daughter and second child born to German priest and iconic figure of the Protestant Reformation, Martin Luther and his wife, Katharina von Bora. She did not survive infancy.

Life
The infant was born quite sickly, possibly due to her mother's exposure to the Black Death. Katharina wrote:

References

1527 births
1528 deaths
People from Wittenberg
German Lutherans
Martin Luther
Elisabeth

Child deaths